Quebec High School (QHS) is a high school belonging to the Central Quebec School Board.  The School is located in Quebec City, Quebec, Canada, and is one of three English-language high schools that serve the Quebec city region (the others being Saint-Patrick's High School and Dollard-des-Ormeaux located on CFB Valcartier). The school is composed of three main floors. The school was established in 1804, with an addition of a Girls Only wing in 1875, but in 1941 the school became a mixed school integrating both sexes.

In 2006, QHS began a three-year process to implement an initiative called the Community Learning Centre Project. This initiative was made possible through the Canada Entente agreement with the federal government and the Quebec Ministry of Education.

Relative to its small size, Quebec High School has a great sports program for young athletes. The school's sports program offers coaching for soccer, rugby and basketball. It offers both soccer and basketball "concentrations" where students sometimes spend the first part of their morning developing their sport-specific athletic skills.

References

External links
 

High schools in Quebec
English-language schools in Quebec
Schools in Quebec City
Quebec Anglophone culture in Quebec City